Afshin Rattansi, British award winning journalist.
 Shihab Rattansi, working currently for the Qatari owned Al Jazeera English channel.

Disambiguation pages with surname-holder lists